WVAL (800 AM) is a radio station serving St. Cloud, Minnesota airing a classic country format. It airs news on the hour from CBS News Radio. The station is owned by Tri-County Broadcasting. WVAL first aired in 1963, went on hiatus in the early 1980s, returning to the airwaves in 1999. The station shares AM towers with its three other sister stations, WMIN, WBHR, and WXYG. There are seven total towers. The call sign is based on owner Herb Hoppe's wife Val.

History
In January 1996, Tri-County Broadcasting filed to build a radio station on 800 kHz in Sauk Rapids, which came to air on March 29, 1999. However, the frequency was not new to the company. The original WVAL had operated on the frequency until moving to 660 kHz in 1983; however, relaxed ownership rules allowed the company to start a second AM. Tri-County moved the WVAL call sign from 660 kHz to the new station and also revived the music it had played in its glory days in the 1970s and early 1980s with classic country, a rarity for the time.

References

External links
AM 800 WVAL official website

Radio stations in St. Cloud, Minnesota
Classic country radio stations in the United States
Radio stations established in 1999
1999 establishments in Minnesota